The New Zealand Council of Trade Unions (NZCTU or CTU) is a national trade union centre in New Zealand. The NZCTU represents 360,000 workers, and is the largest democratic organisation in New Zealand.

History 
It was formed in 1987 by the merger of the New Zealand Federation of Labour (NZFL or FOL) and the Combined State Unions (CSU).

The NZCTU is closely associated with the Labour Party.  While there is no formal link between the two, some unions are formally affiliated to the Labour Party, and the President of the NZCTU speaks at the party's annual conference.

The NZCTU is affiliated with the International Trade Union Confederation.

Presidents

2015–Present: Richard Wagstaff, former PSA national secretary
2007–2015: Helen Kelly, former TEU national secretary
1999–2007: Ross Wilson
 1987–1999: Ken Douglas, ONZ
New Zealand Federation of Labour
1979–1987: Jim Knox, ONZ
1963–1979: Sir Tom Skinner, KBE
1953–1963: Fintan Patrick Walsh

Secretaries

2019–Present: Melissa Ansell-Bridges, former Equity Director
2015–2019: Sam Huggard, former NDU and FIRST Union campaigns officer
2008–2015: Peter Conway, former NZCTU economist
1999–2007: Paul Goulter, former general secretary of the financial sector union Finsec
1987–1999: Angela Foulkes, ONZM

Affiliated unions

Formerly Affiliated unions

References

External links
 NZCTU official site.

 
International Trade Union Confederation
Trade unions in New Zealand
National federations of trade unions
Trade unions established in 1987
1987 establishments in New Zealand